Coplay Creek is a  tributary of the Lehigh River in eastern Pennsylvania.

Coplay Creek joins the Lehigh River at Hokendauqua in Lehigh County.

See also
List of rivers of Pennsylvania

References

Rivers of Lehigh County, Pennsylvania
Rivers of Pennsylvania
Tributaries of the Lehigh River